Samson Gwede Mantashe, popularly known as Gwede Mantashe, (born 21 June 1955) is a South African politician and trade unionist, who as of 18 December 2017, serves as the National Chairperson of the African National Congress.  He is also a former chairperson of the South African Communist Party and Secretary General of the ANC. On the 26th of February 2018, during a cabinet reshuffle by president Cyril Ramaphosa, Mantashe was appointed Minister of Mineral Resources. In May 2019, he became Minister of Mineral Resources and Energy, when his earlier portfolio was merged with the energy portfolio.

Early life and education
Samson Gwede Mantashe was born in 1955 in the village of Cala in the Transkei (now Eastern Cape). He studied at the University of South Africa (Unisa) in 1997, and completed a B.Com Honours degree in 2002. He also acquired a master's degree from the University of the Witwatersrand (Wits) in 2008. He completed his MBA through MANCOSA in 2021.

Labour union activities
He joined the migratory labour force to eke out a living in the mining industry. Beginning his mining experience at Western Deep Levels mine in 1975 as a Recreation Officer and, in the same year, moved to Prieska Copper Mines where he was Welfare Officer until 1982.

In 1982, Mantashe moved to Matla Colliery where he co-founded and became the Witbank branch chairperson of the National Union of Mineworkers (NUM), a position he held until 1984. He was then elected NUM Regional Secretary in 1985. In recognition of his skills, Mantashe became the NUM's National Organiser from 1988 to 1993 and its Regional Coordinator between 1993 and 1994.

Posts 
Mantashe was the Secretary-General of the National Union of Mineworkers until their 12th National Conference held in May 2006 where he was succeeded by Frans Baleni. He made history by becoming the first trade unionist to be appointed to the board of Directors of a JSE Limited-listed company, namely Samancor, in 1995.

He served for two years as Chairperson of the Technical Working Group of the Joint Initiative for Priority Skills Acquisition (Jipsa).

He was the chairperson of the South African Communist Party until July 2012. He is currently a member of the Politburo of the South African Communist Party. He was elected Secretary-General of the African National Congress at the party's 52nd National Conference in 2007.

Controversy 
During Zuma’s presidency, Mantashe was a key figure in the project to shield him from accountability by closing ranks around him.   In 2013 Mantashe maintained that Zuma's relationship with the Gupta family was not ANC business. In 2021 he said that it was around that time that the hold of the Gupta family over Zuma was becoming more clear.  In 2017, four years after the problematic relationship was noticed, Mantashe threatened ANC parliamentarians with disciplinary action if they voted against Jacob Zuma in a no-confidence motion.

As secretary general of the ANC, he instructed members of Parliament to always side with Zuma.  Mantashe insisted that ANC parliamentarians should not be asked to vote with their conscience, observing "I don't know where this notion comes from that we are a collection of individuals who have conscience. We are members of ANC in a party political system".  Former ANC MP Makhosi Khoza has told the state capture commission that Mantashe said that "anyone who sought to uphold the rule of law will be severely punished". Mantashe was opposed to removing Zuma as president despite the allegations of corruption as he felt it would destabilize the ANC government.

The manifesto of the South African communist party, of which Mantashe served as chairperson, says that "the means of life are concentrated in the hands of a small privileged class [that] obtains, by virtue of that economic supremacy, control of the entire State Power".  Mantashe has been accused of facilitating and directly benefiting and benefiting from the process of state capture, a process that concentrates economic power in the hands of the politically well-connected.

The Zondo Commission inquiry referred evidence relating to Mantashe for further investigation, adding that there was a reasonable prospect this would uncover a corruption case against him.  A state prison contractor provided Mantashe free security upgrades for three of his properties.

Mantashe maintained that the ANC would have taken longer than 27 years to be able to replace apartheid era office holders without the policy of deploying loyalist ANC cadres into key positions.  Dismissing the constitution, which demands a non-partisan civil service, Mantashe said "everyone deploys" and likened it to employment equity and black economic empowerment.  Mantashe has said that he realised ANC MPs could face tension between party loyalty and loyalty to the people, but disagreed with Zondo who said if a party could decide appointments; it could abuse this power "to achieve ends which are not in the best interests of the country".

Leadership of the ANC 
Between 19 and 20 September 2008 the National Executive Committee (NEC) of the African National Congress held extended, closed meetings. At a news conference afterwards, Mantashe, serving as ANC Secretary General, announced that the ANC had "recalled" President Thabo Mbeki.

In February 2010, Julius Malema called on Mantashe to resign after Malema was booed at the SA Communist Party's special conference in Polokwane. The National Union of Metalworkers of SA (Numsa) publicly backed Mantashe. "Mantashe is being singled out and targeted because he is a communist," Numsa general-secretary Irvan Jim said.

Mantashe delivered the Inaugural Violet Seboni memorial lecture at the Johannesburg City Hall on 16 April 2010, where he addressed corruption in the ANC. He said "The new order [after 1994]... inherited a well-entrenched value system that placed individual acquisition of wealth at the very centre of the value system of our society as a whole".

In 2021 Mantashe said that he did not receive a bonus or salary increase while ANC workers were not being paid their salaries.  The secretary-general is the ANC's highest paid official and employee.

Mantashe welcomed news that four ANC members confirmed being implicated in a trove of leaked emails relating to the Gupta family, saying that during his tenure the ANC would "lie blatantly" in the face of negative developments.  He said that the 105 year old liberation movement needed to change its posture on matters in the public domain, and show that it was actually taking measures to address the problems.  Responding to allegations that he received free security upgrades at three of his houses, Mantashe has denied any dealings at all with Bosasa and is refusing to step down from office.

References

1955 births
Living people
People from Sakhisizwe Local Municipality
Xhosa people
South African Communist Party politicians
African National Congress politicians
South African trade unionists
University of South Africa alumni
Members of the National Assembly of South Africa